DuBois Township is located in Washington County, Illinois. As of the 2010 census, its population was 748 and it contained 366 housing units.

History
DuBois Township is named for Jesse K. Du Bois, state auditor of public accounts, 1856–1864.

Geography

Demographics

References

External links
City-data.com
Illinois State Archives

Townships in Washington County, Illinois
Townships in Illinois